The Staatliche Münzen Baden-Württemberg (SMBW) is a coin mint in Germany, producing coins of the euro currency.

It was established in 1998 as the result of a merger between the Karlsruhe and Stuttgart mints. Nonwithstanding the merger, the two formerly separate mints have retained their respective mint marks: 'F' for Stuttgart and 'G' for Karlsruhe.

The SMBW has been chosen by the Latvian government to mint its euro coins, since Latvia joined the eurozone on 1 January 2014.

See also
Latvia and the euro
Staatliche Münze Berlin
Hamburgische Münze
Bavarian Central Mint
Euro
Coin mint

References

Mints of Germany
Economy of Baden-Württemberg